Shevardnadze is a Georgian surname, originally from the province of Guria. Notable people with the surname include:

 Dimitri Shevardnadze (1885–1937), Georgian artist
 Eduard Shevardnadze (1928–2014), Soviet and Georgian politician, son of Dmitri's cousin
 Nanuli Shevardnadze (1929–2004), Soviet and Georgian journalist and activist, wife of Eduard from 1951
 Sophie Shevardnadze (born 1978), Russian and Georgian journalist, granddaughter of Eduard

Georgian-language surnames